"You Know That I Love You" is a pop song written and produced by Terry Britten and recorded by Australian pop singer Christie Allen. The song was released in September 1978 as Allen's debut single and lead single from Allen's debut studio album, Magic Rhythm (1979). The song peaked at number 67 on the Kent Music Report in Australia.

Track listing 
7" (K 7248) 
Side A – "You Know That I Love You"
Side B – "Nashville Tennessee"

Charts

References 

1978 songs
Christie Allen songs
1978 debut singles
Songs written by Terry Britten
Mushroom Records singles